TV3 (in ), also known as El Ikhbariya (in ) and formerly Algeria 3 (or simply A3), is the third Algerian public national television news channel. It is part of the state-owned EPTV group, along with TV1, TV2, TV4, TV5, TV6, TV7, TV8 and TV9. It is an Arab language channel dedicated for news.

History
TV3 was launched on 5 July 2001. On 28 October 2015, the channel has started broadcasting its programs in HD.

After Launching TV6, TV3 became a news channel.

Programming

Lifestyle and variety shows

Soap operas

Others

Sports competitions 
 Algerian Cup
 Algerian Ligue Professionnelle 1
 Algerian Ligue Professionnelle 2

Former logos of the channel

References

External links
 Official website 
 

Television in Algeria
Television channels and stations established in 2001
Television stations in Algeria